The Phillips Insulated Wire Company Complex is an historic industrial site at 413 Central Avenue in Pawtucket, Rhode Island. They were built by the Phillips Insulated Wire Company between about 1898 and 1927. The company, established in 1888, was one of the most successful manufacturers of coated wire products, in an industry that ranked as the third-largest in Pawtucket. The complex was used by a variety of owners for the manufacture of such products until 2003.

The complex was listed on the National Register of Historic Places in 2004.

See also
National Register of Historic Places listings in Pawtucket, Rhode Island

References

Industrial buildings completed in 1898
Industrial buildings and structures on the National Register of Historic Places in Rhode Island
Buildings and structures in Pawtucket, Rhode Island
National Register of Historic Places in Pawtucket, Rhode Island